Georges Pallu (1869–1948) was a French screenwriter and film director active in the silent and early sound eras. Pallu directed more than forty short and feature films during his career. He is also sometimes credited as George Pallu.

Selected filmography

Director
 Cláudia (1923)
 Sister of Mercy (1929)

References

Bibliography
 Ann C. Paietta. Saints, Clergy and Other Religious Figures on Film and Television, 1895-2003. McFarland, 2005.

External links

1869 births
1948 deaths
20th-century French screenwriters
Film directors from Paris